Ante Tomislav Moric (born 19 April 1974) is an Australian professional soccer coach and former player who is the head coach for Bankstown City FC.

A midfielder, Moric represented Australia at youth, Olympic, and senior levels. After retirement he become a coach, initially at the Under 20 level at Sydney United in the NSW NPL, then St George, before being appointed head coach of Victorian NPL side Dandenong City in 2019.

Playing career
Moric played at club level in Australia and Croatia for St. George, AIS, Sydney United, Zadar, Canberra Cosmos, Sydney Olympic, Fraser Park, APIA Leichhardt Tigers and Rockdale City Suns.

He also participated at the 1996 Summer Olympics.

Coaching career 
In September 2011, Moric was hired as U13 manager for Sydney United 58 FC for the 2012 season. After a stint with the youth side of National Premier Leagues NSW 2 side St George FC, in April 2019 Moric was appointed as the new head coach of National Premier Leagues Victoria side Dandenong City SC, taking over the club in bottom place on the ladder. He left the position on 17 September 2019 and became a part of the technical staff and fitness department of Western United. Upon the announcement of Western United entering a team in the National Premier Leagues Victoria 3, Moric was named as the assistant coach of the squad as well as the head of youth football for the club. In mid-2022, Moric signed as head coach for Bankstown City FC in NSW League Two.

References

1974 births
Living people
Australian soccer players
Australian people of Croatian descent
Olympic soccer players of Australia
Footballers at the 1996 Summer Olympics
Association football midfielders
Sydney United 58 FC players
Sydney Olympic FC players
NK Zadar players
Canberra Cosmos FC players